St Peter's Church is in the village of Swettenham, Cheshire, England.  The church is recorded in the National Heritage List for England as a designated Grade II* listed building.  It is an active Anglican parish church in the diocese of Chester, the archdeaconry of Macclesfield and the deanery of Congleton.  Its benefice is combined with that of Marton, Siddington, Eaton and Hulme Walfield.

History

It is considered that a Norman church followed by a timber-framed church (of which some timbers remain in the sanctuary) was on the site of the present church.  The nave is thought to have been added in around 1500. The building was encased in brick in the early 1720s and most of the timber framework was lost partly at this time and partly during later restorations.  In 1846 a restoration was carried out by J. M. Derrick in Romanesque style and a Victorian restoration in 1865 was in Gothic Revival style.  Another restoration took place in 1926.

Architecture

Exterior

The plan of the church consists of a west tower, a four-bay nave with north and south aisles, a two-bay chancel and a north porch.  The tower is built in brick, as is the wall of the north aisle, while the wall of the south aisle is stone.  The roofs are of slate.  On the west face of the tower is a door above which is a window and above that a clock in a diamond-shaped wooden frame.  On the top of the tower is a brick parapet with a stone coping and vase finials on the corners, and a weather vane on a high-standing metal support.  Above the north porch is a sculpture of an ass's head upon the coronet of a marquess, which is the crest of the Mainwaring family.

Interior

The pulpit is thought to date from the time of Queen Anne and was placed in the church around 1722. The altar rails are placed round three sides and in the church are three Jacobean chairs.  Two fonts are present, one dating from the 18th century and the other from the Romanesque restoration.  To the south of the altar is a stained glass window which contains some medieval glass.  In the south aisle walls are four Gothic monuments. On the north aisle wall are painted commandment boards.  A fragment of a Saxon cross is set high in the wall between the nave and the south aisle.  In the vestry, above the Bryce family memorial, is mounted an old fiddle which was played in the church until about 1811.  The organ was built in 1964 by Noel Mander incorporating some of the pipework from the previous organ by Bryceson.  There is a ring of three bells, which are dated from around 1500, from 1627 and from 1689.  The parish registers begin in 1547 and the churchwardens' accounts in the 17th century.

See also

Grade II* listed buildings in Cheshire East
Listed buildings in Swettenham

References

External links

Medieval stained glass information from CVMA

Church of England church buildings in Cheshire
Grade II* listed churches in Cheshire
Romanesque Revival church buildings in England
Gothic Revival architecture in Cheshire
Diocese of Chester
Timber-framed churches
Wooden churches in England